Allan Arthur Montreuil  (August 23, 1943 – January 18, 2008) was an American Major League Baseball second baseman who appeared in five games for the 1972 Chicago Cubs. He threw and batted right-handed.

A graduate of De La Salle High School in New Orleans, Montreuil attended Loyola University before being signed by the Boston Red Sox in 1964. He was sent to the Cubs in 1969 after spending almost four full years at the Double-A level in the Boston organization.

Montreuil made his Major League debut on September 1, 1972, at Wrigley Field in a 14–3 win against the San Diego Padres. He collected his lone MLB hit in the fourth inning of that game, a single off right-hander Bill Greif. Montreuil started three games at second base for Chicago in the waning weeks of 1972, handling 15 chances without making an error. He played in the Cubs' organization through 1975.

After his retirement from baseball, Montreuil worked as a small business owner and realtor before retiring in 1999. For the last 40 years of his life, he lived in Terrytown, Louisiana. He died on January 18, 2008, and was interred at Westlawn Memorial Park & Mausoleum in Gretna, Louisiana.

References

External links

1943 births
2008 deaths
Baseball players from New Orleans
Chicago Cubs players
De La Salle High School (New Orleans, Louisiana) alumni
Loyola Wolf Pack baseball players
Major League Baseball second basemen
Midland Cubs players
People from Terrytown, Louisiana
Pittsfield Red Sox players
San Antonio Missions players
Tacoma Cubs players
Toronto Maple Leafs (International League) players
Waterloo Hawks (baseball) players
Wichita Aeros players